The Maumelle Ordnance Works Bunker No. 4 is a historic munitions storage facility at 4 Willastein Drive in Maumelle, Arkansas.  It is a concrete structure, with a rounded roof and ventilation stack.  It is covered with earth, with a trapezoidal concrete side wall exposed, which has a steel door at its center.  The bunker was built in 1941–42 to store the explosives picric acid and ammonium picrate for use during World War II.  Of 21 built in Maumelle, all but three have been demolished, and this is the only one that is entirely intact.

The bunker was listed on the National Register of Historic Places in 2006.

See also
National Register of Historic Places listings in Pulaski County, Arkansas

References

Military facilities on the National Register of Historic Places in Arkansas
Buildings and structures completed in 1942
Buildings and structures in Pulaski County, Arkansas
Bunkers
1942 establishments in Arkansas
National Register of Historic Places in Pulaski County, Arkansas